De Vuelta a Casa (Back to home) is a studio album recorded by Puerto Rican singer Eddie Santiago, returning to Rodven label in 1996.

Track listing
This information adapted from Allmusic.

Credits

Musicians
 Eddie Santiago (vocals)
 Nino Segarra (vocals background)
 Celso Clemente (bongos)
 Danny Fuentes; Gamalier González; Raffi Torres (trombone)
 Domingo Garcia (piano)
 Efraín Hernández (bass)
 Jimmy Morales	(congas)
 Santiago "Chago" Martínez (timbals)
 Hector Perez	(percussion, vocals)

Production
 Authors: Luis Angel; Pedro Azael; 
 Composer: Sady Ramírez; Aida Rivera; Eddie Santiago
 Director: Tommy Villarini; Louis García; Ernesto Sanchez
 Engineers: Juan "Pericles" Covas; Vinny Urrutia
 Clothing/Wardrobe, Make-Up: Angel Medina
 Photographer: Jorge Velazquez	
 Recording Studio:

References

1996 albums
Eddie Santiago albums